Jeffrey Rohlicek (born January 27, 1966) is an American former professional ice hockey center who played nine games in the National Hockey League for the Vancouver Canucks.

Biography
Rohlicek was born in Park Ridge, Illinois. As a youth, he played in the 1979 Quebec International Pee-Wee Hockey Tournament with the Chicago Hawks minor ice hockey team.

In the 1985 World Juniors in Finland Rohlicek had 2 assists, helping the US to a 6th-place finish, as Canada won its 2nd Gold Medal.

He scored the Cup-winning goal for the Springfield Indians in overtime in the deciding game of the 1990 Calder Cup championship finals.

He currently lives in Canada.

Career statistics

Regular season and playoffs

International

Awards
 WHL West Second All-Star Team – 1984 & 1985

References

External links
 

1966 births
Adirondack Red Wings players
American men's ice hockey centers
American people of Czech descent
Chicago Cheetahs players
Chicago Wolves (IHL) players
Fort Wayne Komets players
Fredericton Express players
Ice hockey players from Illinois
Indianapolis Ice players
Kelowna Wings players
Living people
Milwaukee Admirals (IHL) players
Mississippi Sea Wolves players
Nashville Knights players
New Haven Nighthawks players
Phoenix Roadrunners (IHL) players
Portland Winterhawks players
Spokane Chiefs players
Sportspeople from Park Ridge, Illinois
Springfield Indians players
Toledo Storm players
Vancouver Canucks draft picks
Vancouver Canucks players